Arvis is a Latvian masculine given name and may refer to:
Arvis Gjata (born 1987), Albanian football midfielder
Arvis Liepiņš (born 1990), Latvian cross-country skier and Olympic competitor
Arvis Piziks (born 1969), Latvian professional road bicycle racer
Arvis Vilkaste (born 1989), Latvian bobsledder 

Latvian masculine given names